Rat Root Lake is a lake in Koochiching County, in the U.S. state of Minnesota.

Rat Root Lake was named for the roots eaten by muskrats.

See also
List of lakes in Minnesota

References

Lakes of Minnesota
Lakes of Koochiching County, Minnesota